Kyösti Salokorpi (born 5 November 1976) is a Finnish songwriter and musician. He owns the production company Le Sound Royal.

Salokorpi has written and produced songs for various Finnish artist such as Jenni Vartiainen, Kristiina Wheeler, Kristiina Brask, Sini Sabotage, Robin and Teflon Brothers.

Salokorpi has cuts in Germany, Japan, South-Korea, Australia, Belgium and Russia. In spring 2012 the song ”Lady Luck”, co-written with Pessi Levonen, was third on Japan's single list.

Salokorpi has played guitar in Scandinavian Music Group and is the vocalist of his own band '’Atlético Kumpula '’. He has performed his own songs with his bands ’’Ihmepoika’’ and ’’ The Teenage Lesbians’’.  Salokorpi has also produced Scandinavian Music Group's album "Hölmö rakkaus ylpeä sydän".

Selected Discography

Albums

 2005: Scandinavian Music Group – Hölmö rakkaus ylpeä sydän (production) Sony BMG
 2007: Manna – Sister (production) Suomen musiikki
 2008: Scandinavian Music Group – Missä olet Laila? (musician) Sony Music
 2009: Scandinavian Music Group – Palatkaa Pariisiin (musician) Sony Music 
 2009: Leki & The Sweet Mints (BELGIA) – Leki & The Sweet Mints (composition, production)
 2011: Scandinavian Music Group – Manner (musician) Sony Music
 2012: Kristiina Wheeler – Sirpaleista koottu (production) Universal Music
 2012: Atlético Kumpula – Puutarhajuhlat (co-writer, production, vocals) Fullsteam Records
 2013: Atlético Kumpula – Pitkä matka kotiin (co-writer, production, vocals) Fullsteam Records
 2013: Robin – Boom Kah (co-writer, production) Universal Music 
 2014: Scandinavian Music Group – Terminal 2 (muusikko) Sony Music

Singles
 2006: Annika Eklund – Shanghain valot (lyrics) Warner Music Finland
 2007: Kristiina Brask – Nyt mä meen (co-writer) HMC
 2008: Mikael Konttinen – Milloin (lyrics) Universal Music
 2008: Jenni Vartiainen – Mustaa kahvia (composition, lyrics) Warner Music Finland
 2009: Scandinavian Music Group – Näin minä vihellän matkallani (adaptation) Sony Music
 2011: Kristiina Wheleer – Ihanaa (production) Universal Music 
 2012: Atlético Kumpula – Me kuulutaan yhteen (co-writer, production, vocals) Fullsteam Records
 2013: Atlético Kumpula – Paperilyhty (co-writer) Fullsteam Records
 2013: Atlético Kumpula – Annabella (composition, lyrics, production, vocals) Fullsteam Records
 2014: Sini Sabotage – Kaikkihan me ollaan prinsessoi (composition) Universal Music
 2014: Teflon Brothers – Maradona (kesä '86) (co-writer) Johanna Kustannus 
 2014: Suvi Teräsniska – Vain ihminen (co-writer) Universal Music

References

See also
 Le Sound Royal on Facebook
 Atlético Kumpula on Facebook

Living people
21st-century Finnish male singers
Finnish songwriters
1976 births